The 23rd Wisconsin Infantry Regiment was a volunteer infantry regiment that served in the Union Army during the American Civil War.

Service
The 23rd Wisconsin was organized at Madison, Wisconsin, and mustered into Federal service on August 30, 1862.

The regiment was mustered out on July 4, 1865, at Mobile, Alabama.

Casualties
The 23rd Wisconsin  suffered 1 officer and 40 enlisted men killed in action or who later died of their wounds, plus another 5 officers and 262 enlisted men who died of disease, for a total of 308 fatalities.

Commanders
 Colonel Joshua James Guppey (August 30, 1862July 4, 1865) was nominal commander through the entire life of the regiment, but was absent for the second half of 1863 and first half of 1864 due to illness and injury.  By the time he was well enough to return, in July 1864, he was made an acting brigade commander.  After the war he received an honorary brevet to brigadier general.
 Lt. Colonel William Freeman Vilas (June 5, 1863August 25, 1863) mustered in as captain of Co. A, and was promoted to major then lieutenant colonel.  He had command of the regiment in the summer of 1863 when Colonel Guppey was incapacitated by illness.  He resigned his commission in August 1863.  After the war he became a United States senator.
 Lt. Colonel Edgar P. Hill (August 25, 1863January 1864, June 1864January 1865) was originally captain of Co. C.  He was acting commander of the regiment after the resignation of Lt. Colonel Vilas.  
 Major Joseph E. Green (January 1864June 1864, January 1865June 1865) was originally captain of Co. D.  He was acting commander of the regiment while Lt. Colonel Hill was on leave in Wisconsin.

Notable people
 John F. Appleby was a corporal in Co. E throughout the war.  During the war, Appleby invented and patented a manual magazine feed breech loading needle gun.  After the war, he invented and patented several agricultural devices.
 Joseph Bartholomew was an enlisted man in Co. H.  He rose to the rank of sergeant with this company, and was then commissioned a 2nd lieutenant in the 49th Wisconsin Infantry Regiment.  After the war he became chief justice of the North Dakota Supreme Court.
 Rockwell J. Flint was a sergeant in Co. C, but transferred to the Signal Corps in 1863. After the war became a Wisconsin legislator and U.S. marshal.
 Birney Maries Jarvis was enlisted in Co. A and served throughout the war.  After the war he became a Wisconsin legislator.
 Edmund Jüssen was lieutenant colonel until his resignation in March 1863.  After the war served as an American diplomat.
 William Seamonson was enlisted in Co. D and rose to the rank of sergeant, serving through the entire war.  After the war he became a Wisconsin legislator.
 John Starks, son of Argalus Starks, was 1st lieutenant of Co. I.  He was wounded in the trenches at the Siege of Vicksburg and later died of his wound.  He previously served as an enlisted man in the 6th Wisconsin Infantry Regiment. 
 Henry Vilas, son of William F. Vilas, was 2nd lieutenant of Co. E and later captain of Co. A.  Henry Vilas Zoo in Madison, Wisconsin, is named for him.

See also

 List of Wisconsin Civil War units
 Wisconsin in the American Civil War

References

External links
The Civil War Archive

Military units and formations established in 1862
Military units and formations disestablished in 1865
Units and formations of the Union Army from Wisconsin
1862 establishments in Wisconsin